Răzvan Dincă Raț (born 26 May 1981) is a Romanian former professional footballer who played as a left-back.

He made a name for himself in Romania at Rapid București, with which he won two national titles, one national cup and one supercup between 1998 and 2003. The latter year, Raț moved to Shakhtar Donetsk of Ukraine, collecting 15 domestic trophies and one UEFA Cup over the course of ten seasons. In 2009, he came second in voting for the Romanian Footballer of the Year award. He also represented West Ham United, Rayo Vallecano, PAOK and ACS Poli Timișoara before retiring in 2018.

Raț made his full debut for the  Romania national team in 2002. He participated with the country in two UEFA European Championship and was appointed captain in September 2011. Raț is the fourth-most capped Romanian international of all time, earning his 100th match in October 2014.

Club career

Early career
Born in Piatra-Olt, Raț began his football career when he joined the local team Rapid Piatra-Olt aged seven in a team trained by his father. In the summer of 1994, Raț went on a trial with Universitatea Craiova. He impressed coach Anghel Mităchescu and joined the club's youth system at age 13. When Mităchescu found out that he was going to be released from his duties by club president Rodion Cămătaru, he transferred the entire junior squad at the Divizia B side Constructorul Craiova. Raț's career for Constructorul, however, ended shortly after due to the club's financial problems, in 1995. In the winter of that year, Raț was noticed by Tudorel Stoica, who attended a futsall tournament held in Balș. Stoica wanted Raț to join Steaua București's youth system. Despite both Stoica and youth coach Bujor Hălmăgean being impressed by the young player, Raț never joined Steaua because according to his father, the club refused to pay the youth, Raț being forced to support himself in Bucharest. Taking advice from his former coach Mităchescu, Raț joined Sporting Pitești, the team trained by former international player Nicolae Dobrin. In his first match, Raț was substituted for the last 10–15 minutes of the game after he had scored five or six goals.

On 2 September 1996, after being noticed by Silviu Stănescu, Raț joined Divizia B side Cetatea Târgu Neamț. Despite being only 15 years old, Raț trained with the senior squad. On 19 November, the arrest of Cetatea's main sponsor led to the dissolution of Cetatea Târgu Neamț. Raț getting the chance to play only two matches for the juniors of Cetatea. He later rejoined Sporting Pitești.

In June 1998, Mircea Lucescu noticed Raț, and he signed his first professional contract with Rapid București on 26 June. Raț started his professional career with Romanian Premier League side Rapid București in 1998.

Shakhtar Donetsk

In 2003, Raț was signed by Ukrainian club Shakhtar Donetsk, where he became a key player. He played the whole game as Donetsk won the 2009 UEFA Cup Final.

West Ham United
On 21 May 2013, Raț signed for English Premier League club West Ham United on a free transfer on a one-year contract, with the option to extend it. His West Ham debut came on 27 August 2013 in a League Cup game against Cheltenham Town in which West Ham won the game 2–1.

On 31 January 2014, Raț was released from his contract with West Ham by mutual consent. He had played 20 games in all competitions without scoring.

Late career
On 13 February 2014, Raț joined Spanish La Liga side Rayo Vallecano until the end of the 2013–14 season. On 15 June 2014, PAOK announced they had made a verbal agreement with Raț, who signed a two-year contract at the Superleague Greece club.

On 20 August 2015, Raț returned to Rayo Vallecano after agreeing to a two-year deal. On 31 January 2018, after making no appearances during the campaign, he cut ties with the club. On 22 March 2018, Raț returned to Romania with ACS Poli Timișoara, totalling ten games before retiring.

International career

On 8 February 2002, Raț was called up to the Romania national team for the first time. Five days later, he made the starting lineup in his full debut in a Friendly against reigning world and European champions France. Raț played his first official match on 12 October, in a Euro 2004 qualifier match against Norway, playing as a left midfielder.
Following the rise of Cristian Chivu in becoming first-choice in central defence, Raț became the first-choice left back for Romania. On 28 April 2004, Raț scored his first goal for the national squad in a 5–1 win against Germany in the worst away defeat for Germany in the past 65 years. On 31 May 2014, Raț scored only his second goal for Romania, but it was the winning goal in a 1–0 victory against Albania in a match played in Yverdon-les-Bains, Switzerland.

In 2008, Raț made the squad for the UEFA Euro 2008 tournament. He helped Romania to a 0–0 draw against previous FIFA World Cup finalists France and a 1–1 draw against world champions Italy in the so-called "group of death". Romania, however, were eliminated after a 2–0 loss to the Netherlands.

He is a bronze medalist Cyprus International Football Tournament 2011. Raț earned his 100th cap for Romania on 14 October 2014 in a 2–0 victory away to Finland in UEFA Euro 2016 qualifying.

Career statistics

Club

International
Scores and results list Romania's goal tally first, score column indicates score after each Raț goal.

Honours
Rapid București
Divizia A: 1998–99, 2002–03
Cupa României: 2001–02
Supercupa României: 2002

Shakhtar Donetsk
Ukrainian Premier League (7): 2004–05, 2005–06, 2007–08, 2009–10, 2010–11, 2011–12, 2012–13
Ukrainian Cup (5): 2003–04, 2007–08, 2010–11, 2011–12, 2012–13
 Ukrainian Super Cup: 2005, 2008, 2010
UEFA Cup: 2008–09

Individual
Gazeta Sporturilor Romanian Footballer of the Year runner-up: 2009

See also
 List of men's footballers with 100 or more international caps

References

External links

 
 
 
 
 
 

1981 births
Living people
People from Olt County
Romanian footballers
Romania under-21 international footballers
Romania international footballers
Romanian expatriate footballers
Expatriate footballers in Ukraine
Romanian expatriate sportspeople in Ukraine
Expatriate footballers in England
Romanian expatriate sportspeople in England
Expatriate footballers in Spain
Romanian expatriate sportspeople in Spain
Expatriate footballers in Greece
Romanian expatriate sportspeople in Greece
Association football defenders
FC Shakhtar Donetsk players
UEFA Cup winning players
FC Rapid București players
FCM Bacău players
West Ham United F.C. players
Rayo Vallecano players
PAOK FC players
ACS Poli Timișoara players
Liga I players
Ukrainian Premier League players
Premier League players
La Liga players
Segunda División players
Super League Greece players
UEFA Euro 2008 players
FIFA Century Club
UEFA Euro 2016 players